Pygmaleptostylus pygmaeus is a species of beetle in the family Cerambycidae, the only species in the genus Pygmaleptostylus.

References

Acanthocinini